Clypeobarbus breviclipeus is a species of ray-finned fish in the genus Clypeobarbus. It is endemic to the Kwilu River in the Democratic Republic of Congo.

References 

 

Clypeobarbus
Fish described in 2016
Endemic fauna of the Democratic Republic of the Congo